Melicope latifolia is a plant in the family Rutaceae. The specific epithet  is from the Latin meaning "broad-leaved".

Description

Distribution and habitat
Melicope latifolia grows naturally from Malesia to Papuasia and Samoa. In Sabah its habitat is forests and open places from sea-level to  altitude.

Uses
In Peninsular Malaysia and Indonesia, the plant's leaves have been used in the treatment of cramps and fevers. In Indonesia, the plant's resin has been used as a varnish or adhesive.

References

latifolia
Trees of Malesia
Trees of Papuasia
Flora of Samoa
Trees of New Guinea